Akeley may refer to:

Places
United Kingdom
Akeley, Buckinghamshire
Akeley, Leicestershire - a hundred (country subdivision) and a group of rural deaneries

United States
Akeley, Minnesota
Akeley Township, Hubbard County, Minnesota

Other uses
Akeley (surname)